Hypselodoris iacula is a species of colourful sea slug or dorid nudibranch, a marine gastropod mollusk in the family Chromodorididae.

Distribution
This nudibranch is known from the Western Pacific Ocean including Indonesia, the Philippines and Thailand.

Description
Hypselodoris iacula has a pink body and a bright orange mantle. The body and dorsum are covered in a white mesh-like pattern. The gills and rhinophores are orange. This species can reach a total length of at least 25 mm and has been observed feeding on sponges from the genus Euryspongia.

References

External links
 

Chromodorididae
Gastropods described in 1999